Mecochirus longimanatus is an extinct species of lobster-like decapod crustacean from the Jurassic of Europe. The Maxberg Specimen of Archaeopteryx was initially assigned to Mechocirus longimanatus before it was realised that it belonged to Archaeopteryx lithographica.

References

External links

Glypheidea
Jurassic crustaceans
Prehistoric animals of Europe
Jurassic animals of Europe
Crustaceans described in 1822